Magda Sabbahi or Magda (6 May 1931 – 16 January 2020) was an Egyptian film actress notable for her roles from 1949 to 1994.

Life 
Afaf Ali Kamel Sabbahi was born on 6 May 1931 in Tanta, Gharbia Governorate. She was one of the greatest stars of Egyptian cinema, taking the lead role in sixty films. For her film career she took the stage name of Magda.

In 1956, Magda founded her own film production company. In 1958, she played the lead role in the film by Youssef Chahine, Jamila al Jaza'iriya (Jamila, the Algerian) opposite Salah Zulfikar and Ahmed Mazhar, the film was based on the story of Djamila Bouhired.

In 1963, she married the intelligence officer and actor, Ihab Nafe, with whom she had her only daughter, Ghada, in 1965.

In 1968, she starred in a film by Kamal El Sheikh, El Ragol El-lazi fakad Zilloh (The Man Who Lost His Shadow) opposite Salah Zulfikar and Kamal El-Shennawi, the film was based on Fathy Ghanem's novel of the same name.

In 1995, Magda was elected president of the Egyptian Women in Film Association.

Magda Sabbahi died in her house in Dokki, Cairo, on 16 January 2020, aged 88.

Selected filmography 
 1949   El Naseh 
 1957  Ayna Omri 
 1958   Jamila l'Algérienne 
 1960   El Morahekat
 1962   Agazet Noss El Sana
1968  The Man Who Lost His Shadow
 1964   Bayyaet El Garayed 
 1978   EL Omr Lahzah

Notes

References

External links 
  

20th-century Egyptian actresses
1931 births
2020 deaths
Egyptian film actresses
People from Tanta